Mutukan was the eldest son of Chagatai Khan and through him a grandson of the founding Mongol Khagan Genghis Khan. Mutukan (Mö'etüken) was killed during the siege of Bamiyan in 1221. His son was Yesü Nto'a. Yesu' Nto'a was the father of Baraq (Chagatai Khan). Buraq Khan was khan of Moghulistan from 1266 to 1271.

Genealogy of Chagatai Khanates
In Babur Nama written by Babur, Page 19, Chapter 1; described genealogy of his maternal grandfather Yunas Khan as:

References 

1221 deaths
Chagatai khans
13th-century Mongol rulers
Year of birth unknown